Connecticut College (Conn College or Conn) is a private liberal arts college in New London, Connecticut. It is a residential undergraduate institution with approximately 1,815 students. Originally chartered as "Thames College", the college was founded in 1911 as "Connecticut College for Women" in response to Wesleyan University closing its doors to women in 1909. It shortened its name to "Connecticut College" in 1969 when it began admitting men.

Students choose courses from 41 majors, including interdisciplinary, self-designed majors. The college is a member of the New England Small College Athletic Conference.

History

The college was chartered in 1911 in response to Wesleyan University's decision to stop admitting women. Elizabeth C. Wright and other Wesleyan alumnae convinced others to found this new college, espousing the increasing desire among women for higher education. To that end, the institution was founded as the Connecticut College for Women. Their initial endowment came from financial assistance from the city of New London and its residents, along with a number of wealthy benefactors. The college sits on a former dairy farm owned by Charles P. Alexander of Waterford. He died in 1904 and his wife Harriet (Jerome) Alexander died in 1911. Their son Frank sold a large part of the land to the trustees to found Connecticut College.

The Hartford Daily Times ran an article on October 12, 1935 marking the college's 20th anniversary: "On September 27, 1915, the college opened its doors to students. The entering class was made up of 99 freshmen students, candidates for degrees, and 52 special students, a total registration of  151. A fine faculty of 23 members had been engaged and a library of 6,000 volumes had been gathered together." The college became co-educational in 1969, as President Charles E. Shain claimed that there was evidence that women were becoming uninterested in attending women's colleges. At that time, the school adopted its current name, Connecticut College.

Connecticut College is accredited by the New England Commission of Higher Education. and has been so continuously since December 1932. (Prior to 2018, NECHE was known as the Commission on Institutions of Higher Education of the New England Association of Schools and Colleges.) Connecticut College's most recent comprehensive reaccreditation took place in spring 2018.

Academics
The college's academics are organized into thirty-one academic departments and seven interdisciplinary programs with forty-one traditional majors plus opportunities for self-designed courses of study. Starting with the class of 2020, students at Connecticut College participate in a new interdisciplinary general education curriculum called Connections. Its most popular majors, by 2021 graduates, were:
Psychology (44)
Economics (36)
Political Science & Government (34)
Biology/Biological Sciences (27)
Neuroscience (22)

Connecticut College has a history of undergraduate research work and students are encouraged to make conference presentations and publish their work under the guidance of a professor. The college had 182 full-time professors in 2017–18; 93% held a doctorate or equivalent. The student-faculty ratio is about 9 to 1.

Admissions
Admission to the college is considered "more selective" by U.S. News & World Report.  The college received 6,784 applications for the Class of 2023 (entering fall 2019) of which 2,538 (37.4%) were accepted. Of the 68% of the entering class who submitted SAT scores, the middle 50% range was 650–710 for evidence-based reading, and 660–740 for Math.

Rankings

In the 2022 college rankings of U.S. News & World Report, Connecticut College ranked 55th (tie) among liberal arts colleges, 63rd (tie) for "Best Undergraduate Teaching", 40th (tie) for "Most Innovative", 69th for "Best Value", and 144th for "Top Performers in Social Mobility".  
Washington Monthly ranked Connecticut College 27th in 2020 among 218 liberal arts colleges in the US based on its contribution to the public good, as measured by social mobility, research, and promoting public service. Forbes ranked Connecticut College 128th overall in its 2019 list of 650 liberal arts colleges, universities and service academies; 55th among liberal arts schools, 62nd in the Northeast, and 96th among private colleges. Connecticut College is accredited by the New England Commission of Higher Education.

Campus
The main campus has three residential areas. The North Campus contains the newest residential halls. The South Campus contains residence halls along the west side of Tempel Green, across from several academic buildings. The oldest dorms on campus are Plant House and Blackstone House, which were founded in 1914.

Connecticut College's two principal libraries are the Charles E. Shain Library and the Greer Music Library, which is located in the Cummings Arts Center. The Shain Library houses a collection of more than 500,000 books and periodicals and an extensive collection of electronic resources. It is also home to The Linda Lear Center for Special Collections and Archives, and to the Charles Chu Asian Art Reading Room. The Lear Center has more than fifty book, manuscript, and art collections including research archives devoted to Rachel Carson, Eugene O'Neill, and Beatrix Potter. The Charles Chu Asian Art Reading Room serves both as a quiet reading area and as the permanent exhibition space for the Chu-Griffis Art Collection.

The student center is "The College Center at Crozier-Williams" (often shortened to "Cro"), and is located in the middle of the campus. The student center houses the Connecticut College bookstore (which doubles as a small convenience store), the campus post office, the Oasis Snack Shop, and the campus bar, Humphrey's (formerly The Cro Bar). There are also student services offices as well as faculty offices and performance spaces for the Dance department.

The Charles E. Shain Library was originally dedicated in 1976 and is named after former College President Charles Shain. It was renovated, expanded, and re-dedicated in 2015. The renovation was honored by the American Institute of Architects with a 2015 New England Honor Award in the category of Preservation.  In 2016, LibraryJournal named the library a New Landmark Libraries Winner.

Performance spaces on campus include: 
Palmer Auditorium
Tansill Theater, housed in Hillyer Hall
Myers Dance Studio, housed in Crozier-Williams College Center
Harkness Chapel
Evans Music Hall
Fortune Recital Hall
Oliva Hall, housed in Cummings Art Center.

Palmer Auditorium was home to the American Dance Festival from 1947 to 1977, featuring choreographers such as Martha Graham, José Limón, and Merce Cunningham in what was called "the most important summertime event in modern dance."

The Connecticut College Arboretum is a 750-acre (3 km2) arboretum and botanical garden. Students use the arboretum to walk, study, or otherwise enjoy nature. The arboretum is also open to the public.

Harkness Chapel is a fine example of noted architect James Gamble Rogers' colonial Georgian style, with twelve stained glass windows by G. Owen Bonawit. The building is used for denominational religious services, as well as for ceremonies, concerts and recitals, weddings, and other public functions.

The Lyman Allyn Art Museum is located on campus, although it is not connected to the campus proper. The museum's web site states that "the permanent collection includes over 10,000 paintings, sculpture, drawings, prints, furniture, and decorative arts, with an emphasis on American art from the 18th through 20th centuries." This collection is "housed in a handsome Neo-Classical building designed by Charles A. Platt".

Student life

Honor code 

Students live under the college's 85-year-old student-adjudicated honor code, which distinguishes Connecticut College from most of its peers. The honor code underpins all academic and social interactions at the college and creates a palpable spirit of trust and cooperation between students and faculty. Other manifestations of the code include self-scheduled, non-proctored final exams.

Demographics 
In a typical year, the college enrolls about 1,850 men and women from 40 to 45 states, Washington, D.C., and 70 countries. Approximately forty percent of students are men. The fall 2019 student body was 67.5% White, 9.9% Hispanic, 4.1% Asian American, 3.8% African American, and 3.7% multiracial, with an additional 9% international students. The college is now particularly known for interdisciplinary studies, international programs and study abroad, funded internships, student-faculty research, service learning, and shared governance. Under the college's system of shared governance, faculty, staff, students, and administrators are represented on the major committees that  make policy regarding the curriculum, the budget, and the campus and facilities.

Memberships 
Connecticut College is a member of Phi Beta Kappa, the Annapolis Group, and the New England Small College Athletic Conference (NESCAC). The college provides financial aid packages that meet 100 percent of its students' demonstrated financial needs.

Clubs and organizations 
Connecticut College does not offer a Greek system of fraternities or sororities.

The college has seven a cappella groups:

Women

 The ConnChords
 The Shwiffs
 Miss Connduct

Men:
The Co Co Beaux
Coed:
ConnArtists
Vox Cameli
Williams Street Mix

Composer and violinist Margaret Jones Wiles founded and conducted the Connecticut College Orchestra when she taught at the college during the 1950s.

The college radio station (WCNI 90.9 FM) broadcasts a variety of music, including polka, blues, and Celtic music shows. A 2,000 watt transmitter installed in 2003 reaches much of the lower New England region. Connecticut College has two student newspapers in which students handle all aspects of production: reporting, editing, ad sales, management, photography, layout, multimedia, and design. The College Voice  is an editorially independent print and online bi-weekly publication, and The Conntrarian  is an online opinion publication and a member of the Collegiate Network. 

The Student Activities Council (SAC) runs events including club fairs, school dances, concerts, and off-campus excursions. SAC is also responsible for Floralia, the annual spring concert. Recent Floralia artists have included Misterwives, Cash Cash, RAC, and St. Lucia.

Unity House is the college's multicultural center which promotes, supports, educates, and implements multicultural awareness programs on campus. It supports various affinity, activist, and performance student groups. The Women's Center provides a space for programming and events concerning gender issues. The LGBTQIA Resource Center serves queer students and their allies by providing a supportive space, resource library, social events, and educational programming. It also hosts several student organizations. In August 2013, Campus Pride named Connecticut College one of the top 25 LGBT-friendly colleges and universities.

Athletics 
The College's teams participate as a member of the National Collegiate Athletic Association's Division III in the New England Small College Athletic Conference (NESCAC). There are a total of 28 varsity athletics teams at Conn. The twelve men's sports include basketball, cross country, ice hockey, lacrosse, rowing, soccer, squash, swimming and diving, tennis, track and field, and water polo. The fifteen women's sports consist of basketball, cross country, field hockey, ice hockey, lacrosse, rowing, sailing, soccer, squash, swimming and diving, tennis, track and field, volleyball, and water polo. The College also offers coed sailing.

In 2014, the women's soccer team won the College's first and only NESCAC Championship to date, defeating Williams College in penalty kicks.

On December 4, 2021, the men’s soccer team won the College’s first-ever NCAA Division III National Championship by defeating Amherst College in penalty kicks. Earlier in the season, the team won its first NESCAC regular season title.

On January 21, 2021, Connecticut College goalkeeper AJ Marcucci was selected 67th overall in the 2021 MLS SuperDraft by New York Red Bulls. He became the first-ever draft pick from Connecticut College and was the first Division III pick since 2016.

Connecticut College has produced 427 collegiate All-Americans, sixtee  Academic All-Americans and twelve Olympic qualifiers. 

The Connecticut College Athletics Hall of Fame was established in 1989 and currently has over 100 inductees.

Notable alumni

Connecticut College graduates of note include Bloomberg Businessweek senior national correspondent Joshua Green, AOL CEO Tim Armstrong, New York Times best-selling authors Sloane Crosley, Hannah Tinti and David Grann, Academy Award-winning actress Estelle Parsons, fashion designer Peter Som, National Baseball Hall of Fame director Jeff Idelson, philanthropist Nan Kempner, Beyond Meat founder Ethan Brown, Senior Federal District Judge Kimba Wood and American Olympic rower Anita DeFrantz.

References

External links

 
 Connecticut College Athletic Hall of Fame
 

 
Liberal arts colleges in Connecticut
Buildings and structures in New London, Connecticut
Former women's universities and colleges in the United States
Educational institutions established in 1911
Universities and colleges in New London County, Connecticut
Tourist attractions in New London, Connecticut
Ice hockey teams in Connecticut
Private universities and colleges in Connecticut
1911 establishments in Connecticut